Adam Kurtz House, also known as Washington's Headquarters, is a historic home located at Winchester, Virginia.  It was built about 1755, and is of hewn-log construction. It consists of three rooms, with the westernmost room having two of its three exterior walls of stone construction. It sits on a rubble limestone foundation.

The house served as George Washington's headquarters while he was supervising the construction of Fort Loudoun from the fall of 1755 until he moved into the fort in December 1756.

It was added to the National Register of Historic Places in 1976. It is located in the Winchester Historic District.

See also
National Register of Historic Places listings in Winchester, Virginia

References

External links
 
Adam Kurtz House, South Braddock & West Cork Streets, Winchester, Winchester, VA: 12 data pages at Historic American Buildings Survey

Historic American Buildings Survey in Virginia
Houses on the National Register of Historic Places in Virginia
Houses completed in 1757
Houses in Winchester, Virginia
National Register of Historic Places in Winchester, Virginia
Individually listed contributing properties to historic districts on the National Register in Virginia